The following list shows different orders of magnitude of force.

Since weight under gravity is a force, several of these examples refer to the weight of various objects.  Unless otherwise stated, these are weights under average Earth gravity at sea level.

Below 1 N

1 N and above

Notes

External links 

Force